Gljúfrafoss or Gljúfrabúi  ("one who lives in the canyon") is a small waterfall north of the larger falls of Seljalandsfoss in Iceland.  The falls are partially obscured by the cliff rock, but hikers can follow a trail to enter the narrow canyon where the water plummets to a small pool.  There is also a winding trail nearby and a wooden staircase to enable sightseers to climb roughly halfway up and view the falls from another perspective.

See also
Waterfalls of Iceland
List of waterfalls

References

Waterfalls of Iceland
Canyons and gorges of Iceland